Atanas Zehirov (born 13 February 1989) is a Bulgarian professional footballer who plays as a right back and right winger for Arda Kardzhali.

Career

Early career
Zehirov began his career with CSKA Sofia, but made only six league appearances with one goal and spent time on loan to Sliven 2000 before leaving the club in October 2010. He scored his first and last goal for the club against Lokomotiv Mezdra on 13 June 2009.

On 31 January 2011, Zehirov signed as a free agent with Pirin Blagoevgrad, but made only one league appearance, as a substitute, before being released at the end of the season.

In August 2011, Zehirov joined Norwegian side Hasle-Løren IL.

Beroe
On 7 February 2013, Zehirov signed a two-and-a-half-year deal with Beroe Stara Zagora. During his time with the club he primarily has been used in the defence as a right-back. Zehirov made his debut on 22 May 2013, replacing Martin Raynov for the last 13 minutes of a 2–1 away win over Lokomotiv Plovdiv. On 1 March 2014, Zehirov scored his first league goal for Beroe in a 5–0 home win over Lyubimets 2007, scoring the fourth of their five goals.

In the 2014–15 season, Zehirov became Beroe's first-choice right-back. On 8 May 2015, he signed a new two-year extension to his contract. He left the club in May 2017 after his contract expired.

Cherno More
On 1 June 2017, Zehirov agreed to join Cherno More, but the official contract was signed two weeks later. On 15 July, he made his debut in a 1–0 home win over Vitosha Bistritsa, playing as a right winger. On 11 August 2017, he scored his first goal for the club in a 1–1 home draw with Slavia Sofia. Zehirov won the Man of the match award in that game.

International career
On 26 May 2015, Zehirov received his first call-up to the Bulgaria national team for the friendly game against Turkey on 8 June 2015 in Istanbul from Ivaylo Petev, but did not make an appearance. He was called up in November 2016 for a 2018 World Cup qualifier against Belarus national team, during which he remained on the bench. On 3 September 2017, Zehirov made his debut in a 1–3 away defeat by the Netherlands, a 2018 FIFA World Cup qualifier.

Career statistics

Honours

Club
Beroe
Bulgarian Cup (1): 2012–13
Bulgarian Supercup (1): 2013

References

External links

Zehirov Statistics in Norway at fotball.no

1989 births
Living people
People from Blagoevgrad Province
Bulgarian footballers
Bulgaria youth international footballers
Bulgaria under-21 international footballers
Bulgaria international footballers
First Professional Football League (Bulgaria) players
PFC CSKA Sofia players
OFC Sliven 2000 players
OFC Pirin Blagoevgrad players
PFC Beroe Stara Zagora players
PFC Cherno More Varna players
Botev Plovdiv players
FC Botev Vratsa players
Bulgarian expatriate footballers
Bulgarian expatriate sportspeople in Norway
Expatriate footballers in Norway
Association football midfielders
Sportspeople from Blagoevgrad Province